Port Homer is an unincorporated community in Jefferson County, in the U.S. state of Ohio.

History
A post office called Port Homer was established in 1841, and remained in operation until 1943. The community was named for Homer Wallace, the son of an early settler.

References

Unincorporated communities in Jefferson County, Ohio
Unincorporated communities in Ohio